Kang Yoon-sung (born November 16, 1983), better known by his stage name K, is a pop singer from South Korea under contract in Japan. He was born in Goyang. In 2004, after achieving little success with his first album in South Korea, K crossed over to Japan. His first Japanese album, Beyond the Sea, has achieved a sales of over 300,000 copies.

K put his musical activities on hold in 2010 so he could complete the Korean mandatory military service.

Discography

Japanese studio albums

Other Japanese albums

English albums

Korean albums 
 K (April 28, 2004)
 Beautiful Smile (January 20, 2006)

Singles

As lead artist

As featured artist

DVDs 
 Film K: A Voice from the Heaven (February 15, 2006)
 Film K Vol. 2: Music in My Life (June 25, 2008)
 film K vol.3 live K in 武道館〜so long〜 20101130 (March 2, 2011)

Other appearances 
 Wanna Be the Piano Man:  (November 29, 2006)
 Céline Dion Tribute: "To Love You More (featuring Aki)" (September 26, 2007)

Live tours 
 Live K Tour 2006: Beyond the Sea (March—May 2006)
 Live K Tour 2006: Winter (November—December 2006)
 Live K Tour 2007: Music in My Life (June 2007)
 Live K Tour 2008: Ki zu na (June 2008)
 Live K Tour 2009 (March—May 2009)

References

External links 
K Official web site 

1983 births
Gr8! Records artists
Japanese-language singers of South Korea
K-pop singers
Japanese male pop singers
Living people
People from Goyang
South Korean male singers
South Korean J-pop singers
Sony Music Entertainment Japan artists
Studioseven Recordings artists
Stardust Promotion artists
21st-century Japanese singers
21st-century South Korean singers
21st-century Japanese male singers